A half-moon switch is a type of electronic toggle switch. It is commonly used in electronic instruments, mainly in adjusting the Chorale and tremolo in a Leslie speaker.

Function 
In a Leslie speaker, the function of the switch is to control the speed of the oscillating horn, thus controlling frequency of the vibrato. It ranges from slowest (labelled chorale) to fastest (labelled tremolo). There is often an off position in between the two settings, depending on the switch.

References

Switches